Melica montezumae, Montezuma melicgrass, is a grass species in the family Poaceae that can be found in Texas and Mexico.

Description
The plant is perennial and is caespitose as well. The main panicle branches are ascended or spreadout, while spikelets are pendulous and solitary. They have 1 fertile floret which is diminished. Palea is 2 veined and have scaberulous keels as well. Sterile florets are barren, cuneated, and grow in a clump. Flowers are fleshy, oblong, truncate, and are growing side by side with 3 anthers. Fruits are caryopsis and have additional pericarp.

Ecoology
Melica montezumae grows in shady places in the mountains.

References

Further reading

montezumae
Flora of Texas
Flora of Mexico